The  ("Fen Railway") is a former railway line that was built partly across what was then German territory by the Prussian state railways. It is now entirely in Belgium, because the trackbed of the line, as well as the stations and other installations, were made provisional Belgian territory in 1919 (permanent in 1922) under an article of the Treaty of Versailles.

This had the effect of creating six small exclaves of Germany on the line's western side, of which five remain. The treaty (not the location of the trackbed, per se) also created one small Belgian counter-enclave, a traffic island inside a three-way German road intersection near  which lasted until 1949.

The route is now a cycle way.

Route
At Eupen it connected with the line to Herbesthal where it joined the Brussels-Cologne main line. At  it connected with the Liège-Luxembourg line.

History

The line was built to carry coal and iron. The section of the line from Aachen to Monschau was opened on 30 June 1885. The link to Walheim was opened on 21 December 1889.

As a consequence of the new border demarcation, the route of the line now changed several times between the German Reich territory and Belgium. On 27 March 1920, a border demarcation commission, which included representatives from France, the United Kingdom, Italy and Japan, determined that the Belgian state should be the owner of the railway line and its stations. At the time this generated six German exclaves, five of which still exist today.

However, after the defeat of Germany in 1945, the pre-war situation was re-instated.

After the Second World War, the railway's industrial use declined steadily, so that the line was finally completely shut down and partially dismantled by 1989.

Operation
In latter years, until the end of 2001, the  line operated tourist services, some of which were steam-hauled. These were withdrawn for want of funds to maintain the line.

It was reported in 2008 that, with the  no longer operational, Belgium might have to return the land the line runs along to Germany, which would result in the reunification of the exclaves with German territory. However, the foreign ministries of Germany and Belgium have since confirmed that the trackbed, even though disused, will stay as Belgian territory and that the German exclaves will therefore remain.

A  cycle-way along the route was opened in 2013.

Enclaves and exclaves

Former  enclaves:
 , (1922–1949), surrounded by Belgian territory, was the sixth and southernmost of the  enclaves created in 1922; it contained five households.  The railway suffered severe damage during World War II and was not rebuilt.  It ceased being an enclave when Belgium annexed the entirety in 1949.  Hemmeres was reintegrated into West Germany on 28 August 1958, by an agreement with Belgium.
  was two enclaves from 1949 to 1958.  Unlike its present configuration, the German enclave in 1922 was smaller in area because the central portion (between Grenzweg and a boundary with three turning points west of the Schleebach stream) was Belgian territory. Because the road connecting the two outer German portions (Highways 258/399) was German territory until 1949, the German land formed one enclave.  The intersecting north–south road from Fringshaus to Konzen (now Highway B258, which has no connection to the Belgian road network) was also part of the oddly shaped enclave.  In 1949 Belgium annexed these roads, thus separating the enclave into two enclaves for the next nine years.  In 1958 Belgium ceded the center section of territory to West Germany, in addition to returning the adjacent east–west connecting road. This created one larger enclave in its present form.  Highway B258 is the only portion of land that, once having been a part of the Roetgener Wald enclave, is now not within the enclave. 
 Belgium had a counter-enclave located near Fringshaus  from 6 November 1922 until 23 April 1949, while Germany owned the connecting roads that were part of the Roetgener Wald enclave.  These roads met at a traffic island north of Fringshaus, with the  island itself being a part of Belgium. This counter-enclave was extinguished in 1949 when Belgium annexed the German roads that intersected at the traffic island.  In 1958, when Belgium returned the east–west road to Germany, this traffic island also became part of the Roetgener Wald enclave.

References

External links

Belgium–Germany border
Defunct railroads
Enclaves and exclaves
History of rail transport in Germany
Railway lines in Belgium
Railway lines in North Rhine-Westphalia
Railway lines opened in 1885
Transport in Prussia
Cycleways in Belgium
Cycleways in Germany
Cycleways in Luxembourg